Ceggia is a town in the Metropolitan City of Venice, in Veneto, northern Italy, known for its carnival. It is crossed by the SP58 provincial road and SS14 state road.

Notable people
 
 
Pietro Sforzin (1919-1986), professional footballer

References

Cities and towns in Veneto